Gary Craig Birdsong (born August 16, 1964) is a former American football defensive back who played for the Houston Oilers of the National Football League (NFL). He played college football at University of North Texas.

References 

1964 births
Living people
People from Kaufman, Texas
Players of American football from Texas
American football defensive backs
North Texas Mean Green football players
Houston Oilers players
National Football League replacement players